HMS Honeysuckle was a  that served with the Royal Navy during the Second World War. She served as an ocean escort in the Battle of the Atlantic.

Background
The ship was commissioned on 31 August 1939 by Harland and Wolff from Port Glasgow in Scotland.

War service
On 20 September 1941, HMS Honeysuckle picked up 51 survivors from the CAM ship Empire Burton, which was torpedoed by the German U-boat U-74. That same day, she picked up an additional 22 survivors from the tanker T.J. Williams, which has torpedoed by a different U-boat, U-552. On 4 July 1943, she picked up 276 survivors from the merchant St. Essylt, which was torpedoed by U-375 off of Algeria.

Fate
She was scrapped in 1950 at Grays.

Sources

References

1940 ships
Ships built on the River Clyde
Flower-class corvettes of the Royal Navy